The following is a list of episodes from the series Spirit Riding Free.

Series overview

Episodes

Season 1 (2017)

Season 2 (2017)

Season 3 (2017)

Season 4 (2018)

Season 5 (2018)

Season 6 (2018)

Season 7 (2018)

Season 8 (2019)

Pony Tales: Season 1 (2019)

Pony Tales: Season 2 (2019)

Special (2019)

Riding Academy: Season 1 (2020)

Riding Academy: Season 2 (2020)

Interactive Special (2020)

Notes

References

External links 

Spirit Riding Free